James Christopher Lewis Jr. (born December 19, 1978) is a former collegiate American football defensive back who played college football at the University of Miami. He was drafted 183rd overall in the 2002 NFL Draft by the Indianapolis Colts.

College career
After playing high school football at Piscataway Township High School, a high school in Piscataway, New Jersey, Lewis went to play college football for four years for the University of Miami from 1998 to 2001. During the 2nd quarter of his final game as a Hurricane, the 2002 Rose Bowl against Nebraska, he scored a pick six when he ran 42 yards with an intercepted pass from Heisman Trophy-winning quarterback Eric Crouch for a touchdown—which increased the score for Miami, 20–0. Miami would win the bowl game 37–14, and afterwards were considered consensus national champions.

Post-college career
Lewis graduated after his senior season and was drafted in the 6th round (183rd overall) by the Indianapolis Colts. Although signed by the Colts, he did not make the final roster.

References

External links
Miami Hurricanes profile

1978 births
Living people
People from Piscataway, New Jersey
Sportspeople from Middlesex County, New Jersey
Players of American football from New Jersey
African-American players of American football
American football safeties
Piscataway High School alumni
Miami Hurricanes football players
21st-century African-American sportspeople
20th-century African-American sportspeople